David Salazar may refer to:

 David Salazar (footballer, born 1991), Mexican footballer for Club América Premier
 David Salazar (footballer, born 1999), Chilean footballer for O'Higgins
 David Salazar (politician), Peruvian politician